Heroes of the Range is a 1936 American Western film directed by Spencer Gordon Bennet and starring Ken Maynard, June Gale and Harry Woods.

Main cast
 Ken Maynard as Ken Smith  
 June Gale as Joan Peters  
 Harry Woods as Bull Lamton  
 Harry Ernest as Johnny Peters  
 Bob Kortman as Slick  
 Bud McClure as Lem  
 Tom London as Bud  
 Bud Osborne as Jake 
 Frank Hagney as Lightning Smith 
 Jack Rockwell as Sheriff

References

Bibliography
 Jeremy Agnew. The Creation of the Cowboy Hero: Fiction, Film and Fact. McFarland, 2014.

External links
 

1936 films
1936 Western (genre) films
1930s English-language films
American Western (genre) films
Films directed by Spencer Gordon Bennet
Columbia Pictures films
American black-and-white films
1930s American films